Bowling at the 2017 Summer Deaflympics took place at the Samsun Bowling Hall.

Medal summary

Medalists

References

External links
 Bowling

2017 Summer Deaflympics
2017 in bowling